Linger Ficken' Good ... and Other Barnyard Oddities is the third studio album by American industrial rock band Revolting Cocks. The title is a satirical spoonerism of the advertising slogan employed by KFC in the 1970s—"Finger Lickin''' Good."

Videos were made for two singles, the first of which was the cover of "Da Ya Think I'm Sexy?" which was directed by David F. Friedman and featured Chris Connelly prominently, interacting with the patrons of a sleazy strip club, including Friedman, Jewel Shepard and Linnea Quigley, and being horrified when the club switches into a nightmarish environment (exterior shots were filmed in front of the Ridglea Theater in Fort Worth, Texas). The second video was for "Crackin' Up", which was played on an episode of Beavis & Butthead.

Track listing
All tracks by Revolting Cocks unless noted.

SinglesDa Ya Think I'm Sexy? (1993)
 "Da Ya Think I'm Sexy?"
 "Sergio Guitar" (alternate version of "Sergio")
 "Wrong Sexy Mix" (alternate version of "The Rockabye")Crackin' Up (1994)
 "Crackin' Up [Video Edit]"
 "Crackin' Up [Amyl Nitrate Mix]"
 "Gila Copter [Version 2]"

Personnel

Revolting Cocks
Al Jourgensen – programming, production, guitar, emceeing & backing vocals (4)
Luc van Acker
Chris Connelly – vocals (2-9), programming, drum programming (7), production
William Rieflin – drums, organ (6), programming, production
Paul Barker – bass, programming, production

Revolving Cocks
Mike Scaccia – guitar
Roland Barker – keyboards, saxophone (3, 5, 6), programming
Louis Svitek – guitar
Duane Buford – keyboards, spoken word (10)
Duane Denison – guitar
Timothy Leary – spoken word (1)

Revolting Pussies
Patty Jourgensen – spoken word (10)
Kim Assaley – spoken word (10)

Additional personnel
Steve Spapperi – engineer
Paul Manno – engineer
Critter – engineer
Tom Baker – mastering
Rick Buscher – cover art
Michael Balch – programming (4, uncredited)

Samples
"Gila Copter" - "You have the power!"
Sampled from the scene in the 1991 film The Silence of the Lambs in which the mother of the kidnapped woman addresses the kidnapper on television, pleading with him to free her daughter.

"Crackin' Up" - "What's in the bag, man...?"
Spoken by Christoper Pray in a scene in the 1971 film Dirty Harry in which Harry encounters a bunch of would-be muggers in a tunnel.

"Crackin' Up" - "Crack rock 'n' shit!", "Got some blow?/Got some rock?", "Pushin' the rock", "Always trying to start some shit...!"
Sampled from the 1991 film Boyz n the Hood''.

References

1993 albums
Revolting Cocks albums
Sire Records albums